Nijel Carlos Amilfitano Amos (born 15 March 1994) is a Botswana middle-distance runner who competes in the 800 metres. He won silver at the 2012 Summer Olympics, which was Botswana's first ever Olympic medal. On July 12, 2022, Amos was suspended from competition for doping and has not competed since.

Early life
Nijel Amos is from Marobela village in the North Eastern part of Botswana. He went to Nyamambisi Primary School in Marobela, Shangano Community Junior Secondary School (2007 to 2009) in Nshakashongwe and Tutume McConnell Community College (2010 to 2011).

Running career

Results
At the 2011 African Junior Athletics Championships, Amos ran a Botswana Junior Record time of 1:47.28. Further improving on his record, Amos finished fifth in the 800 metres at the 2011 World Youth Championships in Athletics.

In 2012 Amos improved his National Senior Record to 1:43.11 during a race in Mannheim. He became champion at the 2012 World Junior Championships in Athletics, finishing in a new championship record of 1:43.79. In the 2012 Summer Olympics, Amos won a silver medal in the men's 800 m race, the first Olympic medal for his country. His time of 1:41.73 established a new World Junior Record behind the new World Record set by David Rudisha and is tied with Sebastian Coe for the third fastest individual ever.

After an injury-filled 2013 season, Amos returned to form in 2014. At the 2014 Prefontaine Classic, Amos set a meet record and world-leading time of 1:43.63. At the Herculis IAAF Diamond League, he again set a meet record and world leading mark of 1:42.45. Beating Rudisha for the 2nd time on the season, his performance was the fastest 800m race since the men's 800 m 2012 Olympic final. At the 2014 Commonwealth Games, Amos won the 800 meter gold medal in 1:45.18. In the tactical affair, Amos maneuvered out of a box to pass World Record holder David Rudisha in the last 50 meters.

At the 2016 Summer Olympics, Amos competed in the 800 m and the 4x400 relay. He finished 7th in his heat for the 800 m and did not qualify for the semifinals. The Botswana 4 × 400 m relay team finished 5th in the finals. Amos was the flag bearer for Botswana during the Parade of Nations.

He finished 5th in the 800m at the 2017 World Athletics Championships.

Amos ran a 1:42.14 in the summer of 2018 at the Monaco Diamond League meet, taking first place. It was his best race in the 800 m since his silver medal effort in the 2012 Olympics.

At 2019's Monaco Diamond League, Amos ran 1:41.89, hitting 600 m at 1:15.22.

At the 2020 Summer Olympics, Amos competed in the 800 m, finishing first in his heat. In the semifinal he collided with Isaiah Jewett, resulting in them both falling to the ground. Amos was later reinstated into the final on appeal.

Doping Ban 
On July 12, 2022, Amos was provisionally suspended from competition by the Athletics Integrity Unit after he tested positive for GW1516, a banned hormone and metabolic modulator that is not approved for use in humans.

See also
 Botswana at the 2012 Summer Olympics

References

External links
 

1994 births
Living people
People from Central District (Botswana)
Botswana male middle-distance runners
Olympic male middle-distance runners
Olympic athletes of Botswana
Olympic silver medalists for Botswana
Olympic silver medalists in athletics (track and field)
Athletes (track and field) at the 2012 Summer Olympics
Athletes (track and field) at the 2016 Summer Olympics
Medalists at the 2012 Summer Olympics
Commonwealth Games gold medallists for Botswana
Commonwealth Games medallists in athletics
Athletes (track and field) at the 2014 Commonwealth Games
Athletes (track and field) at the 2018 Commonwealth Games
Universiade medalists in athletics (track and field)
African Games gold medalists for Botswana
African Games medalists in athletics (track and field)
Athletes (track and field) at the 2015 African Games
World Athletics Championships athletes for Botswana
Universiade medalists for Botswana
African Championships in Athletics winners
Diamond League winners
IAAF Continental Cup winners
Medalists at the 2013 Summer Universiade
Athletes (track and field) at the 2020 Summer Olympics
Medallists at the 2014 Commonwealth Games